Saint Leopold's Church is the Roman Catholic parish church of Donaufeld in Floridsdorf, the 21st district of Vienna, Austria.

Located at Kinzerplatz, it stands at a height of 96 m (315 feet), which makes it the third tallest church in Vienna. Construction was completed in 1914, ten years after the death of its architect, Franz Neumann. Earlier plans to use the church as a cathedral for a new diocese east of the Danube were abandoned when Floridsdorf was merged into Vienna in 1904. The rectory was built under the premise of serving as a bishop's residence. Today the parish belongs to the Archdiocese of Vienna and is entrusted to the pastoral care of the Augustinian Canons of Klosterneuburg.

It is dedicated to Saint Leopold, patron saint of Austria and founder of Klosterneuburg.

External links 
 Information about the building at emporis.com
 Official parish website

Buildings and structures in Floridsdorf
Roman Catholic churches completed in 1914
Leopold
Canons regular
Art Nouveau architecture in Vienna
Art Nouveau church buildings in Austria
20th-century Roman Catholic church buildings in Austria